Chawlia Union is a union parishad situated at Magura Sadar Upazila,  in Magura District, Khulna Division of Bangladesh. There are 20 villages and 20 mouzas in the union.

References

External links
 

Unions of Khulna Division
Unions of Magura Sadar Upazila
Unions of Magura District